Spyridium microcephalum is a species of flowering plant in the family Rhamnaceae and is endemic to the south-west of Western Australia. It is a spreading or erect shrub with linear leaves and heads of woolly-hairy flowers.

Description
The upper surface of the leaves is glabrous and the lower surface is woolly-hairy.

Taxonomy
The species was first formally described in 1858 by Nikolai Turczaninow, who gave it the name Cryptandra microcephala in the Bulletin de la Société Impériale des Naturalistes de Moscou. In 1863, George Bentham changed the name to Spyridium microcephalum in Flora Australiensis. The specific epithet (microcephalum) means "small-headed".

Distribution
Spyridium microcephalum occurs in the Avon Wheatbelt, Esperance Plains, Hampton and Mallee bioregions of south-western Western Australia. It is listed as "not threatened" by the Government of Western Australia Department of Biodiversity, Conservation and Attractions.

References

microcephalum
Rosales of Australia
Flora of Western Australia
Taxa named by Nikolai Turczaninow
Plants described in 1858